Michael Falcon (21 July 1888 – 27 February 1976) was a British Conservative Party politician and an amateur cricketer who played first-class cricket from 1908 to 1936.

Falcon was the son of Michael Falcon of Hotstead House, Norwich and his wife Isabella (née Mordy) from Workington in Cumberland. He was educated at Harrow School and at Pembroke College, Cambridge, where he graduated B.A. and LL.B. in 1910, and was called to the bar in 1911 at the Inner Temple.

During World War I he was a captain in the Territorial Force from 1915 to 1918.

He was elected at the 1918 general election as the Member of Parliament (MP) for East Norfolk, and held the seat until his defeat at the 1923 general election.

He was mainly associated with Cambridge University Cricket Club and Marylebone Cricket Club (MCC), of which he was a member.  He played Minor Counties cricket with Norfolk County Cricket Club from 1906 to 1946, and captained the team from 1912 to 1946. He made 89 appearances in first-class matches, but never played in the County Championship  In 1921 AC MacLaren said Falcon was the best fast bowler in England and regretted that he was not selected for the Ashes that summer. He played in MacLaren's England XI in August 1921 which beat the previously undefeated Australians at Eastbourne, distinguishing himself by taking 6/67 in Australia's first innings.

Personal life 
Falcon was married in 1930 to Kathleen Gascoigne, the daughter of Captain G. C. O. Gascoigne. They had five children, Mary, Sybil, Anne, Michael and Rachel. His brother, Harry, was also a first-class cricketer.

References

External links

1888 births
1976 deaths
Conservative Party (UK) MPs for English constituencies
UK MPs 1918–1922
UK MPs 1922–1923
Alumni of Pembroke College, Cambridge
Members of the Inner Temple
20th-century English judges
British Army officers
Military personnel from Norwich
British Army personnel of World War I
English cricketers
Cambridge University cricketers
Marylebone Cricket Club cricketers
Norfolk cricketers
Gentlemen cricketers
Free Foresters cricketers
Minor Counties cricketers
Gentlemen of England cricketers
British sportsperson-politicians
Oxford and Cambridge Universities cricketers
Cricketers from Norwich
H. D. G. Leveson Gower's XI cricketers
C. I. Thornton's XI cricketers
L. G. Robinson's XI cricketers
P. F. Warner's XI cricketers
People educated at Harrow School